Many people including politicians and officials in India have been spreading that the UN has declared the birthday of former Indian President A. P. J. Abdul Kalam as World Students' Day. But, the UN has never declared 15 October as World Students' Day For the last few years even those who have held important positions in India have been spreading and celebrating it, no one knows how it originated. Rajiv Chandran, UN Information Center for India and Bhutan National Information Officer, told a national media that the United Nations had not made such a statement. October 15 has been declared International Day of Rural Women on the official website of the United Nations. If the United Nations is to make an official announcement on any given day, it must be requested to the General Assembly by one member state and then discussed and voted on. None of this has happened in terms of celebrating Kalam's birthday as World Student Day.

This day should not be confused with International Students' Day celebrated on 17 November.

See also
International Students' Day

References

United Nations days
October observances
Memorials to A. P. J. Abdul Kalam